Beth Brooke-Marciniak (born 1959) is the Global Vice Chair of Public Policy for EY (Ernst & Young). She is also EY's global sponsor for Diversity and Inclusiveness and a prominent advocate for the benefits of inclusive leadership and growth. In 2014 she was listed as the 98th most powerful woman in the world by Forbes.

She previously worked in the U.S. Department of the Treasury for two years where she worked on tax policies in insurance and managed care. Brooke is also a member of the Audit Advisory Committee for the U.S. Department of Defense, is a member of the U.S. delegation to the 53rd and 54th United Nations Commission on the Status of Women, and serves as a Pathways Envoy for the U.S. State Department.

Education
Brooke was the first woman to be awarded a basketball scholarship by Purdue University, from which she earned a bachelor's degree in industrial management/computer science in 1981 and received an honorary degree in 2012.

References

1959 births
Living people
Krannert School of Management alumni
United States Department of the Treasury officials
20th-century American businesspeople
20th-century American businesswomen
Henry Crown Fellows
Purdue Boilermakers women's basketball players